The 2017 Liga 1 U-19 season was the seventh edition of the Indonesia Junior Level League system since its introduction in 2008, and the first since being changed from an under-21 league to under-19. This season's participants were the U-19 teams of 2017 Liga 1 teams. The season began on 8 July 2017 and ended on 8 November 2017.

Winner of the 2014 Indonesia Super League U-21 Semen Padang U21s were the defending champions, as the 2015 Indonesia Super League U-21 wasn't held due to FIFA suspension while the 2016 Indonesia Soccer Championship U-21 was not counted as an official youth league. Persipura U19s won the title on 7 November 2017 after defeating Persib U19s 1–0 in the final.

Format 
The format of this competition was same as 2016 Indonesia Soccer Championship U-21, divided into four acts consist of two group stages and two knockout rounds, which is the semifinals and final. On the first stage, the teams were divided into three groups each containing six clubs, the top two teams of each group and the two best third place advanced to the second stage. The second stage consists of two groups containing four teams in each group, the best team from each group and the best runner-up advanced to the semifinals. The winner of the semifinals advanced to the final to battle for the championship.

Only players born on or after 1 January 1998 were eligible to compete in the tournament.

First round 
First round was the group stage and started on 8 July 2017. All groups played home and away round-robin tournament, with the exception of Group 3 which will play home tournament round-robin.

Group 1

Group 2

Group 3

Ranking of third-placed teams

Second round 
The second round was held on 18-25 October 2017. The draw was held on 11 October 2017. All groups played home tournament round-robin.

Group X
Five matches was held in Kapten I Wayan Dipta Stadium, Gianyar Regency, Bali and one match was held in Kompyang Sujana Stadium, Denpasar, Bali.

|}

Group Y
Three matches was held in Arcamanik Stadium, Bandung, West Java, two matches was held in Siliwangi Stadium, Bandung, West Java, and one match was held in Gelora Bandung Lautan Api Stadium, Bandung, West Java.

|}

Knockout round

Semi-finals

|}

Third Place

|}

Final

|}

See also

 2017 Liga 1
 2017 Liga 2
 2017 Liga 3
 2017 Indonesia President's Cup
 2017 Soeratin Cup

References

2017 in Indonesian football leagues
2017 in Indonesian sport
Indonesia